The 2019–20 Perth Glory FC W-League season was the club's twelfth season in the W-League.

Players

Squad information
Updated 13 November 2019

Coach:  Bobby Despotovski
Assistant Coach:  Jessine Bonzas

Transfers in

Transfers out

W-League

League table

Fixtures

Results summary

Results by round

References

External links
 Official Website

Perth Glory FC (A-League Women) seasons